Pseudaneitea schauinslandi is a species of air-breathing land slug, a terrestrial gastropod mollusc in the family Athoracophoridae, the leaf-veined slugs.

Distribution
New Zealand, Stephens Island and Marlborough Sounds.

Description

References

External links 
 NZETC

Athoracophoridae
Gastropods of New Zealand
Gastropods described in 1897